The European Neighbourhood Policy (ENP) is a foreign relations instrument of the European Union (EU) which seeks to tie those countries to the east and south of the European territory of the EU to the Union. These countries, primarily developing countries, include some who seek to one day become either a member state of the European Union, or more closely integrated with the European Union. The ENP does not apply to neighbours of the EU's outermost regions, specifically France's territories in South America, but only to those countries close to EU member states' territories in mainland Europe.

The countries covered are Algeria, Morocco, Egypt, Israel, Jordan, Lebanon, Libya, Palestine, Syria, Tunisia in the South; and Armenia, Azerbaijan, Belarus, Georgia, Moldova, Ukraine in the East. Russia has a special status with the EU-Russia Common Spaces instead of ENP participation. The EU offers financial assistance to countries within the European Neighbourhood, so long as they meet the strict conditions of government reform, economic reform and other issues surrounding positive transformation. This process is normally underpinned by an Action Plan agreed by Brussels and the target country. The ENP does not cover countries in the current EU enlargement agenda, the European Free Trade Association or the western European microstates.

The EU typically concludes Association Agreements in exchange for commitments to political, economic, trade, or human rights reform in a country. In exchange, the country may be offered tariff-free access to some or all EU markets (notably industrial goods or agricultural products) and financial or technical assistance.

History

Establishment
The European Union's European Neighbourhood Policy aims at bringing Europe and its neighbours closer. It was conceived after the 2004 enlargement of the European Union with 10 new member countries, in order to avoid creating new borders in Europe. It is also designed to prevent the emergence of new dividing lines between the enlarged EU and its neighbours. The vision is that of a ring of countries, drawn into further integration, but without necessarily becoming full members of the European Union. The policy was first outlined by the European Commission in March 2003.

The countries covered include Algeria, Morocco, Egypt, Israel, Jordan, Lebanon, Libya, State of Palestine, Syria, Tunisia in the South and Armenia, Azerbaijan, Belarus, Georgia, Moldova, Ukraine in the East. Russia has a special status with the EU–Russia Common Spaces instead of ENP participation.

On 25 May 2011, the European Commission launched what it described as a new and ambitious European Neighbourhood Policy, backed by more than €1.2 billion in new funding, bringing the total to almost €7 billion. The main priorities and directions of a revitalised ENP strategy are set out in the Joint Communication by the European Commission and the High Representative for Foreign Affairs, titled "A new response to a changing Neighbourhood". It seeks to strengthen individual and regional relationships between the EU and countries in its neighbourhood through a "more funds for more reform" approach – making more additional funds available, but with more mutual accountability.
 
In the South, the first comprehensive policy for the region was the Euro-Mediterranean Partnership (or Barcelona Process) a wide framework of political, economic and social relations between member states of the EU and countries of the Southern Mediterranean. It was initiated on 27–28 November 1995 through a conference of Ministers of Foreign Affairs, held in Barcelona. Besides the 27 member states of the European Union, the remaining "Mediterranean Partners" are all other Mediterranean countries including Libya (which had 'observer status' from 1999 to 2012).

In the East, the Eastern Partnership (EaP) is a policy initiative launched at the Prague Summit in May 2009 that aims to bring the six Eastern European neighbours (Armenia, Azerbaijan, Belarus, Georgia, Moldova and Ukraine) closer to the EU. It represents the Eastern dimension of the ENP and strengthens bilateral relations between the EU and its partners. These states, with the exception of Belarus, also participate in the Euronest Parliamentary Assembly.

In March 2015, the European Commission launched a review of the principles on which the policy is based as well as its scope and how its instruments should be used. The consultation follows four priorities: differentiation; focus; flexibility; ownership and visibility. A Communication setting out proposals for the future direction of the ENP will follow in autumn.

Funding: from the ENPI via ENI to NDICI

Giving incentives and rewarding best performers, as well as offering funds in a faster and more flexible manner, were the two main principles underlying the European Neighbourhood Instrument (ENI) that came into force in 2014 and was merged in 2021 into Global Europe. It has a budget of €15.4 billion and provides the bulk of funding through a number of programmes and replaced The earlier European Neighbourhood and Partnership Instrument (ENPI). This cooperation instrument continues to be managed by Directorate-General for Development and Cooperation and EuropeAid, which turns decisions taken on a political level into actions on the ground. The ENPI funding approved for the 2007–2013 period was €11.2 billion.

Kazakhstan's Foreign Ministry has expressed interest in the ENP and some MEPs have also discussed Kazakhstan's inclusion in the ENP. The EU Neighbourhood Info Centre was launched in January 2009 by the European Commission to make more known the relationship between the EU and its Neighbours.

Agreements

In recent history, such agreements are signed as part of two EU policies: Stabilisation and Association Process (SAP) and European Neighbourhood Policy (ENP). The countries of the Mediterranean and the East European EU neighbours (including South Caucasus, but excluding Russia that insists on creating four EU–Russia Common Spaces) are covered by ENP through the Directorate-General for External Relations. In the ENP Association Agreements (as in similar AAs signed with Mexico and other states) there is no mention of EU membership—this is a concern only to the European ENP states, because for the Mediterranean they cannot join the union in its current form because they are not located in Europe. The ENP AAs are similar to the Partnership and Cooperation Agreements signed with CIS states in the 1990s and to the multiple other AAs governing the relations between the EU and other third countries. The ENP stipulates that after signing of AA with a particular country the EU will make a Country Report and then the two sides will agree on an Action Plan drafted by the EU (including particular reforms, actions and also aid by the EU) for the next three to five years.

Both the SAA and ENP AP are based mostly on the EU's acquis communautaire and its promulgation in the cooperating states legislation. Of course the depth of the harmonisation is less than for full EU members and some policy areas may not be covered (depending on the particular state).

According to EUobserver the ENP countries may be divided into two groups—European states with explicitly stated EU membership possibility for the long term and Mediterranean states with no such statement in the Action Plans. This division is obvious in the two groups for multilateral activities that are meant to supplement the bilateral ENP Action Plans—the Eastern Partnership and the Union for the Mediterranean.

Association Agreements have to be ratified by all the EU member states. AA signed with the Mediterranean states also include a Free Trade Agreement between the EU and the third country. For the East European EU neighbours covered by the ENP such provisions are expected for some of the next Action Plan periods.

Criticism 
Although the Eastern Partnership was inaugurated on 7 May 2009, academic research critically analysing the policy became available by early 2010 (see Elena Korosteleva#Building Research Excellence in Russian and East European Studies at the Universities of Tartu, Uppsala and Kent). Research findings from a UK ESRC research project examining the EU's relations with three Eastern Partnership member states—namely, Belarus, Ukraine, and Moldova—notes both conceptual and empirical dilemmas. First, conceptually the EU has limited uniform awareness of what it is trying to promote in its eastern neighbourhood under the aegis of "shared values", "collective norms", and "joint ownership". Secondly, empirically, the EU seems to favour a "top-down" governance approach (based on rule/norm transfer and conditionality) in its relations with outsiders, which is clearly at odds with a voluntary idea of "partnership", and explicitly limits the input of "the other" in the process of reform. This has led critics to argue that the neighbourhood policies are subordinated to the EU's interests and values, while the role of the "partners" is at best secondary.

The Arab Spring in North Africa shed light on the close personal and business ties between members of governing elites in EU member states and their Mediterranean counterparts. For example, French Foreign Minister Michèle Alliot-Marie was forced to resign due to public outrage over her links to the ousted Ben Ali regime in Tunisia. In 2008, the EU tried to negotiate an association agreement with Libya and earmarked €60 million in ENPI funds to the country over the 2011–2013 period.

Status 

Statistics

See also
 Arctic policy of European Union
 Countries bordering the European Union
 Eastern Partnership
 ENPI Italy–Tunisia CBC Programme
 EUBAM
 Euronest Parliamentary Assembly
 European integration
 Eurosphere
 EU Strategy for the South Caucasus
 Northern Dimension
 Politics of Europe
 Third-country economic relationships with the European Union
 Union for the Mediterranean

References

Further reading

Academic policy papers
 Building a Stronger Eastern Partnership: Towards an EaP 2.0, Global Europe Centre, University of Kent, September 2013
 Belarus and the Eastern Partnership: a National Values SurveyGlobal Europe Centre, University of Kent, October 2013
 Moldova’s Values Survey: Widening a European Dialogue in Moldova, Global Europe Centre, University of Kent, January 2014

Books
 Korosteleva, E.A, (2012), The European Union and its Eastern Neighbours: Towards a more ambitious partnership? London: BASEES/Routledge Series on Russian and East European Studies, 
 Korosteleva E.A, (Ed.) (2011), Eastern Partnership: A New Opportunity for the Neighbours?, London: Routledge, 
 Korosteleva, E.A, (2011), The Eastern Partnership: Problems and Perspectives, (in Russian), Minsk: Belarusian State University

Book chapters
 Wolfgang Tiede und Jakob Schirmer: „The EU’s Eastern Partnership – Objectives and Legal Basis", in: "The European Legal Forum" (EuLF) 3/2009, pp. 168–174.

Academic journal articles
 Esther Barbé and Elisabeth Johansson-Nogués: "The EU as a Modest 'Force for Good': The European Neighbourhood Policy", International Affairs, Vol. 84, no. 1 (Jan, 2008); pp. 81–96.
 Elena Korosteleva: Belarusian Foreign Policy in a Time of Crisis', Journal of Communist Studies and Transition Politics, Special Issue, 27(3–4) 2011, pp. 566–86
 Elena Korosteleva:'Change or Continuity: Is the Eastern Partnership an Adequate Tool for the European Neighbourhood', International Relations, 25(2) 2011, pp. 243–62
 Elena Korosteleva:'Eastern Partnership: a New Opportunity for the Neighbours?’, Journal of Communist Studies and Transition Politics, Special Issue, 27(1) 2011, pp. 1–21
 Wolfgang Tiede and Jakob Schirmer: „Strategische Notwendigkeit – Die Östliche Partnerschaft der Europäischen Union" („Strategic Necessity – The EU’s Eastern Partnership"), in „WeltTrends" (Zeitschrift für internationale Politik und vergleichende Studien), 71/2010, pp. 10–14.
 Elena Korosteleva:'Moldova's European Choice: Between Two Stools', Europe-Asia Studies, Vol. 62(8) 2010, pp. 1267–89
 Elena Korosteleva:'The Limits of EU Governance: Belarus' Response to the European Neighbourhood Policy', Contemporary Politics, Vol. 15, No. 2, June 2009, pp. 229–45
 Elena Korosteleva and Gisselle Bosse: "Changing Belarus ? The Limits of EU Governance in Eastern Europe ”, Conflict and Cooperation, Vol.44, No. 2 2009, pp. 143–65
 Wolfgang Tiede and Jakob Schirmer: "Die Östliche Partnerschaft der Europäischen Union im Rahmen des Gemeinschaftsrechts" ("The European Union's Eastern Partnership under Community law") in Osteuropa-Recht (OER)) 2009 (German Law Journal), vol. 2, pp. 184–191
 Jaume Castan Pinos: 'The Conflicting Aims of the European Neighborhood Policy and its Secondary Effects', Journal of Borderlands Studies 29 (2) 2014, pp.  133–146.

External links 
 European Neighbourhood Policy at European Union External Action Service
 EU Neighbourhood Info Centre
 EU Neighbourhood Library
 European Neighbourhood Policy Website
 Eurostat – Statistics Explained – European Neighbourhood Policy (statistical data)
 Website on the programming of EC development cooperation for the ENP region
 Eastbook.eu – Portal on Eastern Partnership – (part of ENPI) 

Foreign relations of the European Union
European Union external borders